Aretha's Best is a greatest hits compilation by Aretha Franklin released in 2001. This "best of" album contains 20 tracks which were recorded by Franklin from 1967-1987.

Critical reception

Stephen Thomas Erlewine of AllMusic writes, "Rhino's Aretha's Best is notable for attempting to squeeze highlights of every era of Aretha's career onto one disc."

Chart performance
Aretha's Best peaked at number 49 on the Billboard 200.

Track listing
All track information and credits adapted from the album's liner notes.

Charts

References

External links
 Aretha Franklin Official Site
 Rhino Records Official Site

2001 greatest hits albums
Aretha Franklin compilation albums
Rhino Records compilation albums